Songhor may refer to:
Sonqor, Iran
Songhor Lagoon, Ghana
Songhor Abad, Iran
Songhor Town, Nandi Hills, Kenya